The 44-foot motor lifeboat was the standard workhorse of the United States Coast Guard (USCG) rescue boat fleet.
The 44′ MLB has been replaced by the 47′ MLB.
The boats are powered by twin diesel engines, each powering a separate propeller.
The propellers are protected by the hull to help prevent them being damaged if the boat runs aground.  The boats have air-tight compartments forward and aft of the steering station.  The aft compartment is designed to hold litters to strap in injured people, while the forward compartment holds uninjured rescued.

The magazine Popular Mechanics reported in 1966 that the then new fleet of 44 foot motor life-boats represented several "firsts".
The vessels were the first steel-hulled motor lifeboats—earlier vessels had hulls of wood.
The vessels were the first motor lifeboats where a single crew member handled both the engine throttle and steering wheel.
The vessels were the first motor lifeboats designed to automatically right themselves if overturned.

The Canadian Coast Guard operated 18 lifeboats acquired in 1966 using United States Coast Guard specifications. Three other craft were obtained in 1975 and 1985 as training vessels.

Over the July 4th weekend of 1980 Richard Dixon, the coxswain of a 44-foot motor lifeboat from the US Coast Guard Station at Tillamook Bay led his crew of four on two separate daring rescues, earning him the rare honor of two separate Coast Guard Medals.

See also 
Waveney-class lifeboat
Response Boat – Medium
 36 foot motor lifeboat
 47-foot Motor Lifeboat
 52-foot Motor Lifeboat
41-foot Utility Boat, Large
CCGS CG 117 and CCGS CG 118

References

External links 

www.44mlb.com/
US Coast Guard 44-foot motor lifeboat restoration project.

Motor lifeboat
Motor lifeboats of the Canadian Coast Guard
Motor lifeboats of the United States